Daphne tenuiflora is a small shrub, of the family Thymelaeaceae. Daphne angustiloba is considered to be a synonym of D. tenuiflora, although the Flora of China treats it as a separate species. D. tenuiflora is native to China (Sichuan and Yunnan) and Myanmar.

Daphne tenuiflora is an evergreen shub, reaching about 0.5 m tall. Its slender pale yellowish green branches grow sparsely. It is often found in high mountain forests at around 2700–5000 m in altitude.

References

tenuiflora
Flora of China
Flora of Myanmar